Dignity may refer to:

Concepts
 Dignitas (Roman concept), an ancient Roman political idea to do with the influence of a citizen
 Dignitatis humanae, the Second Vatican Council's Declaration on religious freedom
 Four Dignities of Shambhala Buddhism

Non-governmental organisations
Dignitas (assisted dying organisation), a Swiss group that assists people with terminal illnesses to die
 Dignitas International, a medical humanitarian organisation that aims to increase access to life-saving treatment and prevention in areas overwhelmed by HIV/AIDS
 Dignité (Centrale des Syndicats Libres de Côte d'Ivoire), a trade union centre in the Côte d'Ivoire, Africa
 DignityUSA and Dignity Canada, organisations of lesbian, gay, bisexual, and transgender Catholics that work for 'respect and justice' for LGBT people in the Catholic Church
 Dignity Village, a collective of homeless people that have created a shanty town near Oregon, USA

Political parties
 Ar-Namys ("Dignity"), Kyrgyzstan
 Dignity, Democracy, Motherland, Armenia
 Dignity Party (Egypt)
 Dignity Party (South Australia), Australia

Music
 "Dignity", a song by Katey Sagal on her 1994 album Well...
 "Dignity", a song by Crash on the 2003 album The Massive Crush
 "Dignity" (New Politics song), a song by New Politics on their 2010 album "New Politics"
 "Dignity" (Deacon Blue song), a song by Deacon Blue on their 1987 album Raintown
 "Dignity" (Bob Dylan song), a song by Bob Dylan on his 1994 album Bob Dylan's Greatest Hits Volume 3
 Dignity (album), a 2007 album by Hilary Duff, or the title song
 Dignity (band), a Dutch R&B group from the late 1990s
 "Dignity", a song by the Swedish progressive metal band Opeth on their 2019 album In Cauda Venenum

Others
 Dignity Battalions, paramilitary combatants under the Manuel Noriega Regime in Panama in the 1980s
 Dignity plc, a UK funeral company, part of Service Corporation International, which markets funeral services under the "Dignity Memorial" and "Dignity Planning" brands in Canada and USA
 Dignity (statue), 50-foot high, lighted sculpture of an Indigenous woman, atop a bluff in Chamberlain, South Dakota, honoring the Lakota and Dakota Peoples
 Dignity, a ship used by the Free Gaza Movement; see December 2008 Gaza Strip airstrikes#Dignity incident

See also
 The Dignity of Labour, a 1979 album by The Human League
 Dignity and Shame, a 2005 album by Crooked Fingers